Dobrocin may refer to the following places in Poland:
Dobrocin, Lower Silesian Voivodeship (south-west Poland)
Dobrocin, Warmian-Masurian Voivodeship (north Poland)